Central Secretariat Service (abbreviated as CSS) is the administrative civil service under Group A and Group B of the Central Civil Services of the executive branch of the Government of India. They are governed by Central Secretariat Service Rules of 1962, which has been issued under the powers of Article 309 of the Constitution of India. The service members work under restrictions and rules of Central Civil Services (Conduct) Rules.

The service serves as the backbone of administrative work and provides permanent bureaucracy and functionary staff in the Union Government ministries, Cabinet Secretariat, Central Secretariat and other offices of Government of India. 

Based on CSS service model, State governments like Bihar, Uttar Pradesh have organised their own independent services like Bihar Secretariat Service and Provincial Secretariat Service of UP. The Union Government ministries such like Railways, Defence and External Affairs, have organised their own independent services based on CSS model which are known as Railway Board Secretariat Service, Armed Forces Headquarters Civil Services and Indian Foreign Service, Group B (general cadre) respectively.

History
In the year 1919, the Imperial Secretariat Service came into being as one of the offshoots of the Lewllyn-Smith Committee which had been set up on the eve of the introduction of the Montagu–Chelmsford Reforms. The posts of Assistant and Assistant Secretary/Under Secretary were filled by officers drawn from the Imperial Secretariat Service during the British Raj. The recruitment of the members was made by Central Staff Selection Board, which was precursor of the Union Public Service Commission set up in 1926.

In 1946, after India gained independence from Britain, the Imperial Secretariat Service was replaced by Central Secretariat Service in India. However, in Pakistan, a  Central Secretariat Service was formed in Central Superior Services of Pakistan, which was later replaced and renamed to Office Management Group (OMG) and Secretariat Group (SG).

The Central Secretariat Service was formed in 1946 and was established before the creation of All India Services - Indian Administrative Service in 1950, Indian Forest Service in 1966 and Indian Police Service in 1948. CSS is one of the earliest organized services in India.

Recruitment

From 1946 until 2003, 50 percent of direct recruitment into CSS was through the Civil Services Examination conducted by the Union Public Service Commission, the next 25 percent recruitment was through Annual Departmental Examination and next 25 percent by promotion.

However, after the cadre restructuring in 2003, the direct recruitment into CSS through the Civil Services Examination has been stopped.

The mode of recruitment was changed to the grade of Section Officer by way of 50% through Limited Departmental Competitive Examination by Union Public Service Commission
and 50% by seniority.

Allocation and placement
After appointment by the President, the officers (Entry grade/Probationers) are allocated to different Ministries/Departments under Government of India. The Group B officers work in the levels of Assistant Section Officer and Section Officer/Assistant Director (For Directorate). The Group A officers work in the levels of Under Secretary/Deputy Director (For Directorate), Deputy Secretary/Joint Director (For Directorate), Director, Joint Secretary and Additional Secretary under Central Staffing Scheme of Government of India. 

The officers are posted in various Ministries and Departments, Prime Minister's Office, National Security Council Secretariat, intelligence agencies, Apex /Autonomous organizations of Government of India located at different places in the Secretariat in New Delhi. They are also appointed in personal staff of Union Council of Ministers of India.

Deputations
The officers are also posted outside Delhi, or at various places of the country in other offices upon deputation. They can also be deputed for service under an international organization, an autonomous body not controlled by the Government, or a private body as same as under Rule 6 (2)(ii) of IAS (Cadre) Rules.

In 2014, Government of India offered cadre officers on deputation to State governments of India like West Bengal and Uttarakhand. In 2016, Government of India has approved officers to be posted on non-cadre posts in the secretariat of Northeastern states of India.

Designations and Pay grade
{| border="1" cellpadding="5" cellspacing="0" style="margin:auto;"
|-
|
! scope="col" style="background:#efefef;" | Position / Pay Grade in the Government of India
! scope="col" style="background:#efefef;" | Level and Rank in the Central Government
! scope="col" style="background:#efefef;" | Order of Precedence (As per Presidential order)
! scope="col" style="background:#efefef;" |Equivalent Position or Designation in the State Government(s)
|-
! scope="row" style="background:#efefef;" | 1
|Entry Grade
|Assistant Section Officer / Entry-level (Probationer) or Promoted from the post of UDC| -
|Review Officer in State Secretariat
|-
! scope="row" style="background:#efefef;" | 2
|Junior Time Scale
|Assistant Secretary / Section Officer  
| -
|Section Officer
|-
! scope="row" style="background:#efefef;" | 3
| Junior Time Scale (NFSG)
| Assistant Secretary / Assistant Director (to the Directorate) 
| -
|Under Secretary/Sub-Divisional Magistrate
|-
! scope="row" style="background:#efefef;" | 4
|Senior Time Scale
|Under Secretary or Deputy Director (to the Directorate)
| -
|Deputy Secretary/Additional District Magistrate
|-

! scope="row" style="background:#efefef;" | 5
|Junior Administrative Grade (JAG)
|Deputy Secretary or Joint Director (to the Directorate) 
| -
|Joint Secretary/District Magistrate
|-

! scope="row" style="background:#efefef;" | 6
|Selection Grade
|Director 
| -
| Additional Secretary /Deputy Commissioner/Special Secretary
|-

! scope="row" style="background:#efefef;" | 7
|Super Time Scale 
|Joint Secretary to Government of India'| 26
|Secretary/Divisional Commissioner
|-
! colspan="6" |Notes
|-
| colspan="6" |
|}

Reforms
1st Cadre Restructure of 2003
In 2003, a committee was formed under the leadership of Additional Secretary (GOI). The direct induction of CSS officer through Civil Services Examination was permanently stopped. Also a new level G training program was organised for those in line of promotion in the rank of Joint Secretary (GOI) in the SAG level.

2nd Cadre Restructure of 2010
The Government had set up a Committee on Cadre Restructuring of Central Secretariat Service (CSS) in June 2008. The Committee submitted its report in November 2008 for further reforms in the service. The report was finally accepted in 2010 and the number of posts at various levels including Deputy Secretaries and Directors were increased following the review 

3rd Cadre Restructure of 2013
A committee was formed under the leadership of Additional Secretary (GOI) in 2013 for further reforms in the service. The report is currently pending with Prime Minister's Office and is expected to improve the service conditions by increasing the number of posts at the level of Deputy Secretaries.

Mandatory Training Program for CSS Officers
In addition to these, the Government has also introduced mandatory training programs at every level of promotion. The CSS officers are trained both in India and abroad in various institutions starting at Level E onwards.

Controversies
Recently, some CSS officers have been in the list of corrupt bureaucrats and have come under the CBI scanner for alleged involvement in a few corruption cases.

Notable members

Since its inception, CSS has produced few outstanding civil servants in India. Influential members include - M.P. Singh who was appointed as Vice-Chairman of Central Administrative Tribunal at Jabalpur Bench, P.G. Lele  who served as Additional Secretary to Government of India in the Ministry of Finance and M.V. Ayyar who was empanelled as Secretary to Government of India.

Reportedly, in the 1960s, there have been Labour Secretary and Education Secretary in Government of India also from CSS.

List

 N. R. Madhava Menon - Awarded Padma Shri and Padma Bhushan by Government of India and founder director of National Law School of India University
 Anwar Jamal Kidwai - 6th Vice Chancellor of Jamia Millia Islamia University and Secretary to Government of India in Ministry of Information and Broadcasting
 Prem Nath Kirpal - President of Executive Board at UNESCO (1970 to 1972) and Secretary to Government of India in Ministry of Education
 Khwaja M. Shahid - Vice Chancellor of Maulana Azad National Urdu University
 Arun Kumar
 D.B. Singh
 Gautam Sanyal
 U. Sagayam (1989)
 Unnikrishnan Thiruvazhiyode

Influence 
The Railway Board Secretariat Service, the general administration staff in the Ministry of Railways, is modelled after the Central Secretariat Service.

 See also 

 Civil Services of India

References

Books
 Singh, Hoshiar (2011) Indian Administration. Pearson Education India .
 Jayapalan, N. (2001) Indian Administration 2 Vols. Set. Atlantic Publishers & Distri .
 Maheshwari, S.R. (2006) Public Administration in India: The Higher Civil Service''. Oxford University Press .

External links
 CSS Public Service Profile at Government of India Portal.
 The Central Secretariat Division at Ministry of Personnel, Public Grievances and Pensions (DOPT)
 CSS Service Rules 2009 - Gazette of India
 First Report of the Committee on Cadre Restructuring of CSS - 2002
 FAQ CSS RTI, DOPT
 Central Civil Services: Group A, B, C and D
 Complete Executive Record List of CSS
 2013 Civil List (Group A Officers)
 CSS officers Website Official Officers Website

News

Other sources
 Powers and Duties of Officers and Employees as defined in the Manual of Office Procedure
 Prime Minister to oversee postings of Joint Secretaries by The Times of India

Civil Services of India
Central Civil Services (India)
Ministry of Personnel, Public Grievances and Pensions